Cavallino may refer to:

 Bernardo Cavallino, an Italian Baroque painter
 Cavallino, an Italian town in the Province of Lecce
 Cavallino, the Italian word for "little horse"
 Cavallino, the name of a magazine devoted to Ferrari
 Cavallino, a composition by Brian Eno, found at the end of his album, The Shutov Assembly